National Highway 143AG, commonly referred to as NH 143AG is a national highway in India. It is a secondary route of National Highway 43.  NH-143AG runs in the state of Jharkhand in India.

Route 
NH143AG connects Lohardaga, Bhandra, Bero, Karra, Khunti and Tamar in the state of Jharkhand.

Junctions  

  Terminal near Lohardaga.
  Terminal near Tamar.

See also 
 List of National Highways in India
 List of National Highways in India by state

References

External links 
 NH 143AG on OpenStreetMap

National highways in India
National Highways in Jharkhand